Maopenglu East Station is a station of Line 5, Suzhou Rail Transit. The station is located in Wuzhong District, Jiangsu. It has been in use since June 29, 2021; when Line 5 first opened to the public.

References 

Railway stations in Jiangsu
Suzhou Rail Transit stations
Railway stations in China opened in 2021